Graeme Hinchen (born 18 January 1960) is  a former Australian rules footballer who played with Fitzroy in the Victorian Football League (VFL).

Notes

External links 
		

Living people
1960 births
Australian rules footballers from Tasmania
Fitzroy Football Club players
New Norfolk Football Club players